Municipalköping was a type of local government (municipality) in Sweden. Mostly these were minor trade towns with very limited city rights (market rights), which were delegated from larger cities in the same region.

In 1863 the first local government acts were implemented in Sweden. Officially, the term municipalköping disappeared with this reform. There were two acts in the 1863 reform, one for towns and one for rural areas. But under the "rural" act there were also eight market towns, which were instituted as municipalities. This third category included köping, municipalköping and municipalsamhälle. Most of the 95 köpingar became municipalities. The last municipalköping was incorporated into a large municipality in 1956.

Those market towns that did not develop into a municipality are now occasionally referred to as municipalköping, which is more a cultural term in the present-day language.

Settlements that were municipalköpingar

See also 
Köping
Municipalities of Sweden
List of cities in Sweden
Stad (Sweden)

 Municipalkoping
Market towns in Sweden